Walling Jocobse Van Winkle (1650–1725) was an early settler of the Northern New Jersey area and the namesake for the town of Wallington, New Jersey, where he had built a home.

Family history
He was the son of Jacob Walingen (sometimes spelled Waligh) (b. 1599 d. 8/17/1657).  Jacob along with his brother Simon Waligh (b. unknown d. 3//1649) were the first of the Van Winkle family to arrive in America from the Netherlands in 1630.  The brothers were given parcels of land to farm from the Kiliaen van Rensselaer estate which included Papscanee Island.  Simon purchased a plantation on Manhattan Island but was killed shortly after by Native Americans in Pavonia (modern day Jersey City, New Jersey).  

Jacob spent many years after this event traveling between the Netherlands and the Dutch colony of New Netherland negotiating for land purchases within certain parts of the colony.  Jacob became a member of Council of twelve men which was the first representative official body within the states of New York, New Jersey, and Connecticut.  After unsuccessfully trying to start a community along the Connecticut River and drive out the encroaching English settlers, Jacob settled down to farm a large parcel of land located in Pavonia.  

A particularly severe out break of hostilities between the natives and the colonists known as the Peach Tree War forced survivors, including Jacob, to flee to Fort Amsterdam on Manhattan Island.  After peace was restored Jacob returned to Pavonia and rebuilt his farm.  Jacob entered a trade guild in 1657 but died shortly after, leaving behind a wife and seven children.

Personal history
The Dutch custom in the 17th century was that the son would take the father's first name as their last name (Jocobse=son of Jacob)

References

 Van Winkle RE website

1650 births
1725 deaths
People of colonial New Jersey
People of New Netherland
American people of Dutch descent
People from Wallington, New Jersey